Afshar (also Romanized as Afshār) is a village in Qaflankuh-e Sharqi Rural District, Kaghazkonan District, Meyaneh County, East Azerbaijan Province, Iran. At the 2006 census, its population was 228, in 57 families.

References 

Populated places in Meyaneh County